Double Wide is the debut studio album by American recording artist Uncle Kracker. It was released on May 30, 2000, via Lava/Atlantic Records. Recording sessions took place on the back of a tour bus parked in various motels and arena parking lots across the country. Production was mostly handled by Kid Rock with Michael Bradford. The music of the album is noted for its eclectic style, categorized by AllMusic as country, rock rap and rockabilly. Additionally, the album also incorporates elements of hip hop, rock and roll, blues rock and pop.

The album reached top 10 in Germany, Austria and the United States. It was certified platinum by Music Canada on August 13, 2001, and 2× Platinum by the Recording Industry Association of America on November 28, 2001. Regarding the album's success, Kracker stated in 2001 "It gives you that kind of 'I told you so' feeling, because I always knew the record was good."

Track listing
All songs co-written by Robert J. Ritchie and Matthew Shafer, unless noted.

"Intro" – 1:19
"Better Days" (Kenny Olson, James Trombly, Robert J. Ritchie, Matthew Shafer) – 4:50
"What 'Chu Lookin' At?" – 5:12
"Follow Me" (Michael Bradford, Shafer) – 3:35
"Heaven" (featuring Paradime and Kid Rock) (Freddie Beauregard, William Maddox, David Moore, Ritchie, Shafer) – 4:19
"Steaks 'n Shrimp" – 4:13
"Who's Your Uncle?" (Beauregard, Ritchie, Shafer) – 3:56
"Whiskey and Water" (Bradford, Ritchie, Shafer) – 4:43
"Yeah, Yeah, Yeah" (Ritchie, Shafer, Trombly) – 4:59
"Aces & 8's" (Martin Gross, Bradford, Shafer) – 3:53
"You Can't Take Me" (Bradford, Shafer, Trombly) – 3:16

Personnel 
Uncle Kracker – lead vocals, DJ
Kid Rock – guitar, scratching, drums, programming, background vocals, lead vocals on "Heaven"
Paradime – lead vocals on "Heaven"
James Montgomery – blues harmonica
Michael Bradford – bass guitar, guitar, programming, background vocals
James Bones – keyboards, background vocals
Stefanie Eulinberg – drums
Jason Krause – guitar
Kenny Olson – guitar
Lynn Owsley – pedal steel guitar

Charts

Weekly charts

Year-end charts

Certifications

References

External links

2000 debut albums
Lava Records albums
Uncle Kracker albums
Rap rock albums by American artists
Country rock albums by American artists
Atlantic Records albums
Albums produced by Kid Rock
Albums produced by Michael Bradford